South Mosman ferry wharf is located on the northern side of Sydney Harbour serving the Sydney suburb of Mosman.  It is located at the end of Musgrave St, and was known as Musgrave Street Wharf from the 19th century through to the 1990s when the State Government renamed it "Mosman South". Today it is known as South Mosman but many locals still refer to it as Musgrave Street wharf.

Services
South Mosman wharf is served by Sydney Ferries Mosman Bay services operated by First Fleet class ferries.

Historical gallery

References

External links

 South Mosman Wharf at Transport for New South Wales (Archived 13 June 2019)
South Mosman Local Area Map Transport for NSW
 Musgrave Street Wharf (1895), painting by Arthur Streeton (Howard Hinton collection of New England Regional Art Museum)

Ferry wharves in Sydney